Cumia simonis is a species of sea snail, a marine gastropod mollusk in the family Colubrariidae.

Description
The shell size varies between 15 mm and 20 mm

Distribution
This species is found in the Indian Ocean off Madagascar.

References

 Bozzetti, L., 2004. Fusus simonis sp. n. (Gastropoda, Buccinidae) dal Madagascar meridionale. Malacologia Mostra Mondiale 42: 3-4

External links
 

Colubrariidae
Gastropods described in 2004